Més per Mallorca (MÉS) is a Majorcan political coalition formed by Socialist Party of Majorca (PSM), IniciativaVerds (IV) and Entesa per Mallorca (ExM), as well as some small independent, local parties around the island. It was created in 2010 by the PSM, Left Initiative (Iniciativa) and The Greens (EV) under the name PSM–Iniciativa–Verds. After the merger of Iniciativa and EV into IV in 2010, and with the incorporation of ExM in 2011, it was renamed as PSM–IniciativaVerds–Entesa. In 2013, the current name was adopted.

History 

PSM–Iniciativa–Verds was created as an electoral coalition in an effort to unite the ecologist and left Majorcan nationalist political organisations under a common platform after the dissolution of the Bloc for Majorca (Bloc). In summer 2010, an electoral coalition between the PSM, Iniciativa and EV was established to run the 2011 regional election. In November 2010, Iniciativa and EV merged to become IV, and in early 2011 ExM joined the coalition, renaming it to PSM–IV–Entesa.

At the 2011 regional election the coalition received 36,149 votes, which translated to four seats in the Parliament of the Balearic Islands. Additionally, it obtained four seats in the Council of Majorca, and three seats in the Palma City Council.

On 2 February 2013, the members of the coalition's three member parties gathered in an open assembly and decided to take the coalition a step further, adopting a "call document" as well as the current name Més per Mallorca. On 26 October 2013, coalition members participated in another assembly where a set of Operating Rules were adopted and an executive commission was elected, with Biel Barceló (PSM) as general coordinator and co-spokesperson, and Fina Santiago (IV) as co-spokesperson.

On 24 May 2015 the coalition got the greatest historical result by any of its member parties in the regional election, receiving 59,069 votes (14%) and 6 out of the 33 seats in the Mallorca electoral district.

In April 2016, David Abril (IV) and Bel Busquets (PSM) were elected co-spokespersons.

In March 2017, a fraudulent contract to the campaign manager of Més made by Barceló, Vice President of the Government, appeared in the media. This fact created a crisis in the Government and ended up with the resignation of the Regional Minister of Transparency, Ruth Mateu, and the withdrawal of her party, More for Menorca, from the Government, although remaining as an outer supporter. In December 2017, Barceló was accused of accepting a personal travel as a gift. This fact, along with controversies and internal disputes since March, made him resign as Vice President and Regional Minister of Tourism, being relieved by Busquets.

In June 2018, Miquel Ensenyat (PSM), president of the Island Council of Majorca, won Més primaries over Santiago, Regional Minister of Social Services, thus becoming its candidate for the 2019 regional election.

Member parties
Socialist Party of Majorca (PSM)
IniciativaVerds (IV)
Agreement for Majorca (ExM)

Electoral performance

Parliament of the Balearic Islands

Island Council of Majorca

Cortes Generales

Balearic Islands

 * Within Units Podem Més
 ** Within Veus Progressistes

References

Left-wing nationalist parties
Political parties in the Balearic Islands
Political party alliances in Spain
Socialist parties in Spain